The Monument House of the Bulgarian Communist Party, also known as the Buzludzha Monument, was built on Buzludzha Peak in central Bulgaria by the Bulgarian communist government and inaugurated in 1981. It commemorated the events of 1891, when a group of socialists led by Dimitar Blagoev assembled secretly in the area to form an organized socialist movement that led to the founding of the Bulgarian Social Democratic Party, a forerunner of the Bulgarian Communist Party (itself a forerunner of the current Bulgarian Socialist Party).

Construction
Construction of the monument began on 23 January 1974 under architect Georgi Stoilov, a former mayor of Sofia and co-founder of the Union of Architects in Bulgaria. Over 15,000 cubic metres of rock were removed in the process. The monument was built at a cost of 14,186,000 leva, equivalent to US$35 million today.

The monument exemplifies the futurist architecture common to many state-constructed communist buildings. All maintenance ended with the fall of communism in 1989, and the building remains closed to the public due to the hazards of the weakened structure. The Buzludzha Project has helped to begin work on the monument's preservation, with the eventual aim of creating an interpretation center for Bulgarian history.

Mosaics

Inside the building, mosaics commemorating the history of the Bulgarian Communist Party cover approximately 937 square meters; 35 tons of cobalt glass were used in their manufacture. One-fifth of the mosaics have already been destroyed due to age, weather-related deterioration and vandalism.

Mosaics on the outer ring of the monument were built with natural stones gathered from rivers across Bulgaria; these mosaics have mostly vanished due to natural wear.

The building's main ceiling mosaic features the communist hammer and sickle encircled with a Communist Manifesto quote, "Proletarians of all countries, unite!"

Opening ceremony
The monument was opened on 23 August 1981. At the opening ceremony, Bulgarian communist leader Todor Zhivkov announced:

In popular culture
Finnish rock band Haloo Helsinki! shot the entirety of the music video for their 2014 single "Vihaan kyllästynyt" at the monument; Dutch rock band Kensington's 2015 "Riddles" music video was likewise entirely filmed on location there. The closing sequence of Rita Ora's Bang EP video was shot at the monument in early 2021.

The site was used as a filming location for the 2016 action movie Mechanic: Resurrection; special effects were added to show the structure next to a shoreline, with a helipad added to the top of the saucer building. The award-winning British singer/songwriter and novelist, Jonathan R P Taylor, is believed to be the first to have used the derelict structure for his music video 'Vseki den (2012)'. The writer would go on to create the epic literary work 'Meat: Memoirs of A Psychopath', a novel based on a killer cult that lives within secret bunkers below the structure, and which accounts for the urban legend of localized 'French murders'. A spin-off Sci-Fi title: 'Communists in Outer Space' is written in the words of one of their captures, Isabella Davies. Both works are accompanied by the radio-play: 'Zombies in Outer Space' The monument is visited by the main protagonist in the 2018 comedy film I Feel Good.

The 2019 opera Frankenstein by Mark Grey appears to take place inside the Buzludzha Monument.

Travel
Buzludzha can be reached by two side roads from the Shipka Pass, either a  road from Kazanlak in the south or a  road from Gabrovo on the north side of the mountain.

Preservation
Multiple initiatives to preserve the monument had been undertaken throughout the years, most of them political and associated with the Bulgarian Socialist Party. In 2018, the monument was recognized by Europa Nostra as one of the seven most endangered heritage sites in Europe. The most recent preservation works started in 2019 under the Buzludzha Project Foundation, in collaboration with ICOMOS Germany and the municipality of Stara Zagora. Together they were able to secure a $185,000 Getty Foundation grant to establish a Conservation Management Plan for the monument. Early results indicated that the building could be preserved and used, leading to a second Getty grant in July 2020 to stabilize surviving mosaic panels. Conservation and preservation efforts are ongoing.

See also 
 Bulgarka Nature Park

References

External links

 The Buzludzha Monument Archive

 Website dedicated to the preservation of Buzludzha Monument 
 Website dedicated to the archive Buzludzha Monument  
 Getty grant , Published in 2019
 The Economist, Buzludzha: A crumbling reminder of communism, Published on Oct 20, 2014.
 Bulgaria’s crumbling ode to socialism, BBC News, July 26, 2018.
 Podcast About Buzludzha Monument's Current State and Plans To Turn It Into A Museum, Featuring Bulgarian Architect Dora Ivanova
 Buzludzha 3D

Bibliography 
Adrien Minard, Bouzloudja. Crépuscule d'une utopie, Paris, éditions B2, 2018.

Monuments and memorials in Bulgaria
Buildings and structures in Stara Zagora Province
Futurist architecture
7 Most Endangered Programme
1981 establishments in Bulgaria
Buildings and structures completed in 1981